was a haikai-no-renga poet of the early Tokugawa period. 

R H Blyth called Sōin "one of the Fathers of Haiku".

Influence and importance
Sōin founded the Danrin school of haikai poetry, which aimed to move away from the serious 'bookishness' popular in Japanese poetry at the time and become more in touch with the common people, infusing a spirit of greater freedom into their poetry. Their poems explored the floating world of popular urban amusements in a fully colloquial style.

Sōin's haikai (comical renga) became the transition between the light and clever haikai of Matsunaga Teitoku and the more serious and aesthetic renku of Matsuo Bashō.

Disciples
Among the most important members of his school were Ichū, a versatile figure who also painted and wrote waka, and Saikaku.

See also
Haiga

References

External links

A Brief Selection of Poems by Nishiyama Soin

1605 births
1682 deaths
Japanese writers of the Edo period
17th-century Japanese poets